The Central District of Rashtkhvar County is a district (bakhsh) in Roshtkhar County, Razavi Khorasan Province, Iran. At the 2006 census, its population was 42,621, in 10,221 families.  The district has one city: Roshtkhar.  The district has two rural districts (dehestan): Astaneh Rural District and Roshtkhar Rural District.

References 

Districts of Razavi Khorasan Province
Roshtkhar County